Markets Field is a stadium in Garryowen, Limerick, Ireland. It has been redeveloped since 5 June 2015 when it hosted a soccer match between Limerick FC and Drogheda United in the League of Ireland Premier Division. It has been graded a UEFA Category Two stadium with a capacity of around 4,500. The ground has hosted underage international fixtures in 2015 and 2021. The EA Sports Cup final between Limerick FC and St Patrick's Athletic was played in Markets Field on Saturday, 17 September 2016.

History
The site was originally a Gaelic games ground, having been used as a venue for Munster championship games in both hurling and Gaelic football.  Most of the All-Ireland semi-finals between Munster and Connacht teams also took place there in the early years of the 1900s. It was also the home of Garryowen, a rugby club founded in Limerick in 1884, from 1886 until 1957. Garryowen have since moved to new facilities in the Dooradoyle area of Limerick. For most of its life it has been greyhound racing stadium. Greyhound racing ceased on 17 July 2010 with the opening of a new greyhound stadium at Greenpark in the south of the city.

The Markets Field is also the former home of soccer side Limerick FC. In 1962 Limerick F.C. played Liverpool in a friendly at Markets Field with Liverpool winning 5–3. It has hosted two of Limerick's six European ties. First in 1981 they lost 3–0 to Southampton FC of England in the UEFA Cup. Then in 1982 they drew 1–1 in the Cup Winners Cup against Dutch side AZ Alkmaar.

Limerick F.C. were the principal license holder until their demise in 2019, after the ground was purchased by LEDP (Limerick Enterprise Development Partnership) with funds provided by the JP McManus charitable foundation. During late 2013, Limerick Enterprise Development Partnership (LEDP) redeveloped the pitch, investing €400k in a brand new playing surface. In early 2014, after the granting of planning permission for the ground redevelopment the government announced additional funding to redevelop the stadium. The stadium hosted its first match in the refurbished ground on 5 June 2015.

Current use 
Currently, the ground is predominantly used by Treaty United, a soccer club born in Limerick and now represents the city and Mid-West region in the 2021 League of Ireland First Division.

Layout

The refurbished Main Stand holds 1,350 spectators for the home supporters. Away support are housed in a new stand with 360 seats behind the Geraldine Villas goal. The Popular side and the Cathedral End are both standing areas with a corporate box beside the Main Stand. These terrace areas are grassy banks at present. The score board is situated at the Cathedral End. The new tunnel and dressing rooms are under the Main Stand and there are 3 turnstiles named after Limerick football legends. The dugout is at the Popular Side, across the pitch from the tunnel. In 2015 the playing surface at the ground won the "Pitch of the Year Award" from FAI.

Greyhound racing 
The Limerick Greyhound Company was formed in 1933 but it was not until 1937 when the opening night took place at Markets Field. The first directors were T.F.Ryan & J.P.Frost.

The 465 yard circuit came to prominence in 1939 when it was selected by the Irish Coursing Club to hold the Irish Greyhound Derby for first and only time. The event was won by Marchin' Thro' Georgia who won the final in a new track record time of 30.05.

The track then hosted the classic race the Irish St Leger in 1940 before it moved permanently to Limerick in 1944. The track also staged the Irish Oaks in 1942. The allocation of the 1943 Grand National did not help because due to the lack of hurdlers during the war Mr Ryan the chairman of Limerick Stadium was left with no choice but to cancel the event. Other events that took place at Limerick were the Bulger Cup and Kennedy Memorial Cup and J. P. McManus started as a bookmaker at the track and earned the nickname 'Sundance Kid'.

In 1958 the Irish Greyhound Board (Bord Na gCon based in Limerick) was given the responsibility of all tracks in Ireland with the exception of the Ulster tracks that would remain under the jurisdiction of the Irish Coursing Club. They installed a new totalisator system in 1960 as improvements became common place under the new ownership. Major changes in 1966 included a new stand costing over £60,000 and Brendan O’Connell was Racing Manager for over thirty years from 1966.

The track closed in 2009 with the entire operation moving to the newly built Limerick Greyhound Stadium at Greenpark, Dock Road. Racing Manager Gus Ryan retired after 42 years in racing.

Track records

References

Gaelic games grounds in the Republic of Ireland
Limerick GAA
Limerick F.C.
Sports venues in County Limerick
Sports venues in Limerick (city)
Greyhound racing venues in the Republic of Ireland
Defunct greyhound racing venues in Ireland
Association football venues in the Republic of Ireland
Treaty United W.F.C.
Treaty United F.C.